Galium triflorum (also known as cudweed, sweet-scented bedstraw, and fragrant bedstraw) is a herbaceous plant of the family Rubiaceae. It is widespread in northern Europe (Scandinavia, Switzerland, Russia, Baltic States), eastern Asia (Kamchatka, Japan, Korea, Guizhou, Sichuan, India, Nepal) and North America (from Alaska and Greenland south to Veracruz). The plant is considered a noxious weed in New York, Pennsylvania, Vermont, New Hampshire, Connecticut and Massachusetts.

Galium triflorum grows on the forest floor, spreading vegetatively by means of stolons. It has whorled leaves and single fruiting peduncles rising above basal rosettes. There are six bracts in a whorl below the peduncle. Each peduncle has three fruiting structures, each having a single fuzzy ball. Stems are square in cross-section. The entire vine does not feel very coarse, but it is rough enough to stick to clothing.

This species is sometimes confused with Galium odoratum, a species with traditional culinary uses.

References

External links

 Cincinnati Nature
 Jepson Manual Treatment
 USDA Plants Profile
 Photo gallery
Illinois Wildflowers, Sweet-scented bedstraw
California Flora taxon report, Galium triflorum
Blackfoot Native Plants, Potomac Montana, sweet-scented bedstraw, Galium triflorum
Czech Botany, Sweet-scented bedstraw
Den virtuella floran: Myskmåra, Galium triflorum

triflorum
Flora of Europe
Flora of Asia
Flora of North America
Flora of the United States
Flora of California
Flora of Mexico
Flora of Veracruz
Plants described in 1803
Flora without expected TNC conservation status